In mathematics, a variational inequality is an inequality involving a functional, which has to be solved for all possible values of a given variable, belonging usually to a convex set. The mathematical theory of variational inequalities was initially developed to deal with equilibrium problems, precisely the Signorini problem: in that model problem, the functional involved was obtained as the first variation of the involved potential energy. Therefore, it has a variational origin, recalled by the name of the general abstract problem. The applicability of the theory has since been expanded to include problems from economics, finance, optimization and game theory.

History 
Georges Duvaut encouraged his graduate students to study and expand on Fichera's work, after attending a conference in Brixen on 1965 where Fichera presented his study of the Signorini problem, as  reports: thus the theory become widely known throughout France.

Definition 
Following , the definition of a variational inequality is the following one.

the variational inequality problem 
is the problem of solving 
for the variable  belonging to  the following inequality:

where  
is the duality pairing.

In general, the variational inequality problem can be formulated on any finite – or infinite-dimensional Banach space. The three obvious steps in the study of the problem are the following ones:
Prove the existence of a solution: this step implies the mathematical correctness of the problem, showing that there is at least a solution.
Prove the uniqueness of the given solution: this step implies the physical correctness of the problem, showing that the solution can be used to represent a physical phenomenon. It is a particularly important step since most of the problems modeled by variational inequalities are of physical origin.
Find the solution or prove its regularity.

Examples

The problem of finding the minimal value of a real-valued function of real variable
This is a standard example problem, reported by : consider the problem of finding the minimal value of a  differentiable function  over a closed interval . Let  be a point in  where the minimum occurs. Three cases can occur:

 if  then 
 if  then 
 if  then 

These necessary conditions can be summarized as the problem of finding   such that

 for 

The absolute minimum must be searched between the solutions (if more than one) of the preceding inequality: note that the solution is a real number, therefore this is a finite dimensional variational inequality.

The general finite-dimensional variational inequality
A formulation of the general problem in  
is the following: given a subset 
 of 
 
and a mapping 
, 
the finite-dimensional variational inequality problem associated with  
consist of finding a -dimensional vector  belonging to 
 such that

where  
is the standard inner product on the vector space .

The variational inequality for the Signorini problem 

In the historical survey , Gaetano Fichera describes the genesis of his solution to the Signorini problem: the problem consist in finding the elastic equilibrium configuration 
 
of an anisotropic non-homogeneous elastic body that lies in a subset 
The solution  of the problem exists and is unique (under precise assumptions) in the set of admissible displacements 
 
i.e. the set of displacement vectors satisfying the system of ambiguous boundary conditions if and only if

where  
and  
are the following functionals, 
written using the Einstein notation

,     ,     

where, for all , 
 is the contact surface (or more generally a contact set),
 is the body force applied to the body,
 is the infinitesimal strain tensor,
 is the Cauchy stress tensor, defined as

See also
Complementarity theory
Differential variational inequality
Extended Mathematical Programming for Equilibrium Problems
Mathematical programming with equilibrium constraints
Obstacle problem
Projected dynamical system
Signorini problem
Unilateral contact

References

Historical references
. An historical paper about the fruitful interaction of elasticity theory and mathematical analysis: the creation of the theory of variational inequalities by Gaetano Fichera is described in §5, pages 282–284.
. A brief research survey describing the field of variational inequalities, precisely the sub-field of continuum mechanics problems with unilateral constraints.
. The birth of the theory of variational inequalities remembered thirty years later (English translation of the title) is an historical paper describing the beginning of the theory of variational inequalities from the point of view of its founder.

Scientific works

. A short research note announcing and describing (without proofs) the solution of the Signorini problem.
. The first paper where an existence and uniqueness theorem for the Signorini problem is proved.
 .

.
, available at Gallica. Announcements of the results of paper .
. An important paper, describing the abstract approach of the authors to the theory of variational inequalities.
.
, available at Gallica. The paper containing Stampacchia's generalization of the Lax–Milgram theorem.

External links 

  Alessio Figalli,  On global homogeneous solutions to the Signorini problem,

Partial differential equations
Calculus of variations